St. Thomas' English Medium School, also known as STEMS, is a school located in Meerut, Uttar Pradesh, India, established in 1972 by the late (Ms) K. Norhona. Started as very small school with little funds, it is now an eminent educational institution producing top class students for several years. STEMS is affiliated to the ICSE Board. Every year some of the students compete for, and enter Indian Institutes of Technology after passing out of STEMS.

The school prepares pupil in various educational streams which are mostly mandatory with few optional subjects. English, being the dominant language of communication (both written and verbal), all the subjects are taught in English language; apart from Hindi (subject), which is an exception and a regional language. 

STEMS is tied up closely with The Church. Staff members (including administrators, teachers and helpers) practice Catholicism. Daily assembly happens in the large playground where students start their day with prayers and The National Anthem of India, Jana Gana Mana. 

Terminal examinations are held thrice every year to keep a performance check and provide feedback about students' progress. Students are required to answer a set of questions, typically by handwriting all answers on blank sheets of paper, without any biblical or external help in the designated amount of time. Teachers then verify these sheets and award points to every student accordingly. Students are ranked in the order of score. Every year there are students who either fail to secure minimum marks or do not have a minimum attendance. The Principal and teachers decide the fate of such students, based upon which, they are promoted to next year or required to repeat the entire year.

STEMS has been turned to +2 I.S.C. since 2006. This is equivalent to 12th Grade or 12th year after kindergarten. 

Address : 
St. Thomas' English Medium School 
Jyoti Niketan 
Chippi Tank 
Meerut, Uttar Pradesh
PIN 250001

List of subjects taught until 10th grade

External links
 For the students and ex-students of STEMS, Meerut follow us on orkut.
 Map of the school .
 Contact details

Schools in Meerut
Primary schools in Uttar Pradesh
High schools and secondary schools in Uttar Pradesh
Education in Meerut
Educational institutions established in 1972
1972 establishments in Uttar Pradesh